HMS Veteran was a 64-gun third-rate ship of the line of the Royal Navy, launched on 14 August 1787 at East Cowes. She was designed by Sir Edward Hunt, and was the only ship built to her draught.

At end-February 1798 Veteran and  towed  in to Great Yarmouth, Norfolk, after her crew had abandoned her.

In 1801, Veteran was present at the Battle of Copenhagen, as part of Admiral Sir Hyde Parker's reserve fleet.

In 1805, Veteran was captained by Capt. Andrew Fitzherbert Evans. She subsequently served as the flagship of Vice-Admiral Jas. Rich. Dacres, then second in command on the Jamaica Station.

Veteran was broken up in 1816.

Notes

References

 Lavery, Brian (2003) The Ship of the Line - Volume 1: The development of the battlefleet 1650-1850. Conway Maritime Press. .

External links
 

Ships of the line of the Royal Navy
Ships built on the Isle of Wight
1787 ships